Powershop is an online electricity retailer founded in New Zealand, and also available in Australia. In New Zealand, Powershop is a subsidiary of Meridian Energy, which is 51% owned by the New Zealand Government. The retailer operates through an online platform offering pre-pay and post-pay options.

In November 2021, it was announced that a consortium of Shell Australia and Infrastructure Capital Group would be acquiring Meridian Energy Australia Group, including Powershop Australia. Though subject to regulatory approvals, the transition was due to be completed in early 2022. This development caused an uproar among many customers who opposed the takeover of Australia's greenest electricity provider by a multinational oil company.

History 
Meridian Energy traditionally had been a major electricity generator, but only a small retailer. In 2006, Ari Sargent, an electricity industry veteran, had an idea to increase Meridian's market share in the retail market: turn electricity from a utility into a consumer good. Initially, they planned to sell electricity tokens in supermarkets, but they abandoned that idea due to cost and instead considered setting up an Internet marketplace.

Sargent, with Simon Coley, a design specialist, founded Powershop in September 2007. In September 2008, Powershop bought its predecessor, Meridian Energy's Marketplace Innovations Business Unit, for NZ$1.26 million in stock. After 14 months of private beta testing, it was made unofficially available to all before being officially launched to the public on February 22, 2009.

Reception

Powershop planned on 40,000 to 50,000 customers in its first year. Powershop achieved 5,000 customers in October 2009, and 10,000 customers in February 2010. CEO Ari Sargent blamed this on inertia and general distrust of power companies. Energy expert Molly Melhuish claims that because "people are so terrified of their power bills", "a majority of people" wouldn't want to try a new concept like Powershop." The Consumers' Institute of New Zealand welcomes initiatives to increase retail power competition.

In a 2009 survey by the Ministry of Economic Development, Powershop was found to be the cheapest electricity retailer for the typical consumer (one who consumes 8,000 kWh/year) in Auckland, Wellington, Christchurch, Dunedin, Manawatu, and New Plymouth. It was the second cheapest in Whanganui and Wairarapa.

In Consumers' Institute of New Zealand's 2009 survey of electricity companies, Powershop gained the highest rating ever in the history of the survey. 92% of Powershop customers found it 'good' or 'very good'. It did not receive a single poor rating from any of its customers. In 2010, it again received a 92% satisfaction rating. In 2011 and again in 2012, it garnered a 96% customer satisfaction rating.

It was the best company in Consumers' Institute of New Zealand's 2011 survey of electricity companies.

In Australia, Powershop is ranked 1st of 15 companies for customer service tracked by social media tracking website, servicerage.com.

References

External links
Official NZ site
Official AU site

Government-owned companies of New Zealand
Electric power companies of New Zealand